Buin Miandasht, also Romanized as Bu’in Miāndasht or Bu’ino Miāndasht, all meaning "Buin and Miandasht"; The Miandasht part of this city is mainly populated by Iranian Georgians and is known in the Georgian language as Toreli) is a city and capital of Central District, in Buin Miandasht County, Isfahan Province, Iran. At the 2006 census, its population was 9,933, in 2,537 families.

The city was a merger to two smaller settlements Buin and Miandasht.

Buin Miandasht includes Buin and Miandasht and Sheshjavan as a sector of city. (Sheshjavan was a village until 1998)

Gallery

References

Cities in Isfahan Province